Dick's Drive-In,  or simply Dick's, is a fast-food restaurant chain located in the Seattle, Washington area. It was founded in 1954 by Dick Spady, H. Warren Ghormley, and Dr. B.O.A. Thomas. It currently operates eight locations in the Puget Sound region.

History

Founders Dick Spady, H. Warren Ghormley, and Dr. B. O. A. Thomas opened the first Dick's on January 28, 1954, in Seattle's Wallingford neighborhood, on N.E. 45th Street. A grand opening was held on February 20, 1954. In 1955, a second Dick's was opened in Seattle's Capitol Hill district.  This was followed by a third in 1960 in the Crown Hill neighborhood, a 4th in 1963 in Lake City, a fifth in Queen Anne in 1974. All but the Queen Anne location are without customer seating.  The Queen Anne location has indoor tables and no drive-in.

The simple menu has changed little over time. It features fast-food staples such as hamburgers, hand-cut french fries, and individually made milkshakes. Dick's is particularly well known for the "Dick's Deluxe," which includes lettuce, mayonnaise, and chopped pickles.  No substitutions are allowed and all burgers are cooked to well done. For most of Dick's history, the only available omissions were the Deluxe without cheese or fries without salt. More recent menu changes, however, allow ordering plain versions of the hamburger and cheeseburger.

For several years Dick's has offered employee benefits such as a 50% matched 401(k), 100% employer-paid medical insurance, and a college tuition scholarship (currently at $28,000) accessible after six months of employment. In 2013, Dick's Drive-In was voted "the most life-changing burger joint in America" in an Esquire.com poll.

In September 2010, it was announced that Dick's was planning on opening a new sixth location in the Seattle area and that an online poll on their website would determine the new location.  After a few weeks of polling, the area north of Seattle won the right for a new Dick's Drive-In.  On October 15, 2010, Dick's officials announced the new location to be in Edmonds on the corner of Hwy 99 and 220th St. On October 20, 2011, the 6th location in Edmonds opened to the public. The opening occurred multiple weeks ahead of schedule.

In 2017, Dick's launched another poll to determine its seventh location, which would be located either on the Eastside or in South King County. Over 177,000 participants cast their votes, with the majority favoring the South region. Locations being considered included Kent, West Seattle, South Seattle, Renton, Burien, SeaTac, Tukwila, Auburn, Normandy Park, Des Moines and Federal Way. The location opened on December 12, 2018.

In September 2020, Dick's announced that it would launch a food truck to serve five locations in Western Washington that were chosen through a public poll: Bellevue, Bellingham, Everett, Renton, and West Seattle. The restaurant also announced that it would be expanding to the Eastside once a suitable location is found. A collaboration with local chef Edouardo Jordan of Salare and JuneBaby was also announced with a three-day popup event at the Queen Anne location. In December 2021, Dick's opened an Eastside location at the Crossroads Shopping Center in Bellevue. Dick's then announced on April 28, 2022, that it would open a ninth location at The Commons shopping center in Federal Way in 2023.

Locations

Wallingford (opened on January 28, 1954)
Capitol Hill (opened in 1955)
Crown Hill (opened in 1957)
Lake City (opened in 1963)
 Lower Queen Anne (opened in 1974)
Edmonds (opened on October 20, 2011)
Kent (opened on December 12, 2018)
Bellevue (opened in 1965; closed in 1974)
Bellevue Crossroads (opened December 16, 2021)
Federal Way (planned to open in 2023)

There is also an unrelated Dick's Hamburgers restaurant in Spokane.  Although this is a drive-in, operated in much the same manner as the six drive-in locations of the Seattle chain (and with a larger menu), it is not affiliated with Dick's Drive-In.

In popular culture
 Seattle-native rapper Sir Mix-a-Lot places a scene of his 1988 song "Posse on Broadway" at Dick's on Capitol Hill, describing it as a hangout for the rich and cool.

See also
 List of hamburger restaurants

References

External links

1954 establishments in Washington (state)
Companies based in Seattle
Drive-in restaurants
Fast-food chains of the United States
Fast-food hamburger restaurants
Regional restaurant chains in the United States
Restaurants established in 1954
Restaurants in Seattle